"If He Can Fight Like He Can Love, Good Night Germany!" is a World War I song from the perspective of a woman confident that her boyfriend will be a good soldier because he was a good lover. It became a hit after it was released by The Farber Sisters in 1918.

The lyrics and cover art are in the public domain.

Composition
The song was composed by George W. Meyer, with words by Grant Clarke and Howard E. Rogers. It was published by Leo Feist Inc in New York City in 1918.

Performances
A top 20 song in 1918, the sheet music was repeatedly offered in a war edition with insets of the following performers Emma Carus, Flora Starr, Grace Wallace, and Rae Samuels.

References

External links
 View the song MP3 and sheet music cover here.
 https://digitalcommons.conncoll.edu/sheetmusic/1629/

Songs of World War I
Songs about Germany
1918 songs
Songs written by Grant Clarke
Songs written by George W. Meyer